William Bayard Jr. (1761 – September 18, 1826) was a prominent New York City banker and a member of the Society of the New York Hospital. He was a close friend to Alexander Hamilton, who was taken to his Greenwich Village home after his famous duel with Aaron Burr, where Hamilton later died.

Life
Bayard was born in 1761 to Catharine McEvers (1732–1814) and William Bayard Sr. (–1804), who was elected as a delegate to the 1765 Stamp Act Congress, and was assigned to the committee that drafted language opposing taxation without representation.  When the American Revolutionary War broke out in 1775, his father remained loyal to the crown, assisting the British troops that occupied New York City in 1776.  Although Bayard Jr. remained in New York after the war, other members of the family had fled, and many of the family's properties were confiscated.  His siblings included Samuel Vetch Bayard (1757–1832) and Mary Bayard (1779–1849).

Family

Bayard was a member of the prominent Bayard family of French Huguenot ancestry who descended from Balthazar Bayard, a French Protestant, who had taken refuge in the Dutch Republic where the Huguenots found sanctuary from their religious persecution in France. The first Bayards in the New World arrived in the Dutch colony of New Amsterdam with the newly appointed Governor-General Peter Stuyvesant.  In the early 18th century, the Bayards became among the largest landowners in the New York-New Jersey area. Bayard was also a descendant of Stephanus Van Cortlandt and the Schuyler family.

Career
He founded the mercantile firm of LeRoy, Bayard & McEvers with Herman LeRoy and James McEvers. The firm was dissolved in 1816 after McEvers retired and was reorganized as  Leroy, Bayard & Co.  Bayard was director of the Bank of America, president of The Bank for Savings in the City of New-York from its beginnings in 1819, governor of the New York Hospital, trustee of the Sailors' Snug Harbor, member of the New York Society Library, and one of the owners of the Tontine Coffee House.

He was chairman of a meeting in December 1815 that drafted the petition for the Erie Canal and chairman of the celebration planning for the canal's completion in 1825.  From 1801 until 1821, Bayard served as a vestryman at Trinity Church. In 1824, he was chairman of the committee to receive General Lafayette in 1824.

Alexander Hamilton
He was a close friend to Alexander Hamilton and it was to Bayard's Greenwich Village home located just below the present Gansevoort Street where the mortally wounded Hamilton was taken after his famous duel with Aaron Burr. Hamilton died in Bayard's home the next day.

Personal life
In 1783, Bayard married Elizabeth Cornell (d. 1854), daughter of Loyalist Samuel Cornell and Susannah Mabson, and a descendant of Thomas Cornell (ca. 1595–ca. 1655).  Elizabeth's father died in 1781 in British-controlled New York, having moved there from North Carolina after 1777 after refusing to take the Oath of Allegiance to the new United States. Samuel Cornell had transferred a share of his North Carolina property to Elizabeth; in 1779, however, the North Carolina Legislature voted to retroactively seize all property of Loyalists back to 1776. In November 1784, Mrs. Bayard unsuccessfully sued to have her property returned to her.

William Jr. and Elizabeth had seven children, including:
Catherine Bayard (1786–1814), who married Duncan Pearsall Campbell (1781–1861), grandson of Duncan Campbell (d. 1758)
Susan Bayard (1787–1814), who married Benjamin Woolsey Rogers (1775–1859), son of Moses Rogers, a wealthy New York merchant who owned Shippan Point, and Sarah Woolsey, and a distant cousin descended from Thomas Cornell
William Bayard (1788–1875), who married Catherine Hammond
Maria Bayard (1789–1875), who also married Duncan Pearsall Campbell (1781–1861)
Eliza Justine Bayard (b. 1793), who married Joseph Blackwell
Robert Bayard (1797–1878), who married Elizabeth McEvers
Harriet Elizabeth Bayard (1799–1875), who married General Stephen Van Rensselaer IV (1789–1868), son of Stephen Van Rensselaer, both a distant cousin through the Van Cortlandt family.

William died on September 18, 1826 in Westchester and along with his wife, Elizabeth, was buried in the Churchyard Cemetery of Trinity Church in lower Manhattan.

Descendants
Bayard's granddaughter, Eliza Bayard Rogers (1811–1835), through his daughter Susan Bayard Rogers, married William Paterson Van Rensselaer (1805–1872), son of Stephen Van Rensselaer III, on May 13, 1833 in New York City.  William P. Van Rensselaer was a half-brother to Stephen Van Rensselaer IV, the husband of Bayard's youngest daughter, Harriet E. Bayard.  William and Eliza had one son together, William P. Van Rensselaer Jr. (1834–1854), before Eliza's death in 1835.  On April 4, 1839, Van Rensselaer remarried to Eliza's sister, Sarah Rogers, with whom he had the rest of his children.

References
Notes

Sources
Archives of the General Convention

William
1761 births
1826 deaths
American people of Dutch descent
Schuyler family
Businesspeople from New York City
American bankers
People of the Province of New York
Colonial American merchants
Burials at Trinity Church Cemetery